Cheilosia pallipes, the yellow-shouldered blacklet, is a common species of syrphid fly observed in eastern North America. Hoverflies can remain nearly motionless in flight. The  adults are also  known as flower flies for they are commonly found on flowers from which they get both energy-giving nectar and protein rich pollen. Larvae, when known, are plant feeders.

References

Diptera of North America
Hoverflies of North America
Eristalinae
Taxa named by Hermann Loew